George H. Carsley (April 7, 1870 - July 4, 1933) was an American architect. He designed many buildings in Helena, Montana, including structures now listed on the National Register of Historic Places. He also designed a number of buildings on the campus of the University of Montana in Missoula, Montana.

Early life
George Hollis Carsley was born on April 7, 1870, in Wisconsin. He grew up in Helena, Montana. He graduated from the University of Minnesota in 1896.

Career
Carsley began his career by working for architect Cass Gilbert in Saint Paul, Minnesota.

Carsley established his own architectural practice in Helena, Montana, in 1911. He designed the Confederate Memorial Fountain in Hill Park in 1916. Commissioned by the United Daughters of the Confederacy, it was one of few Confederate memorials in the Northwestern United States.

With Gilbert, Carsley designed the masterplan of the campus of the University of Montana in 1917. He also designed the gymnasium and the forestry building in 1922, and Corbin Hall in 1927. With Gilbert, he also designed Helena's Montana Club.

Additionally, Carsley's architectural drawings at the Montana Historical Society Library show that he designed Helena's Placer Hotel, which is listed on the National Register of Historic Places as a contributing property to the Helena Historic District.

Death
Carsley died on July 4, 1933.

References

1870 births
1933 deaths
People from Helena, Montana
University of Minnesota School of Architecture alumni
19th-century American architects
20th-century American architects
Architects from Montana